The following are complete squad rosters of all participating teams who competed at the men's water polo tournament at the 1988 Summer Olympics in Seoul.

Group A

Australia
The following players represented Australia:

Glenn Townsend, Richard Pengelley, Christopher Harrison, Troy Stockwell, Andrew Wightman, Andrew Kerr, Raymond Mayers, Geoffrey Clark, John Fox, Christopher Wybrow, Simon Asher, Andrew Taylor and Donald Cameron. Head Coach: Tom Hoad.

France
The following players represented France:

Arnaud Bouet, Marc Brisfer, Marc Crousillat, Pierre Garsau, Bruno Boyadjian, Philippe Hervé, Michel Idoux, Thierry Alimondo, Michel Crousillat, Nicolas Marischael, Nicolas Jeleff, Pascal Perot and Christian Volpi. Head Coach: Jean Paul Clemencon.

Italy
The following players represented Italy:

Paolo Trapanese, Alfio Misaggi, Andrea Pisano, Antonello Steardo, Alessandro Campagna, Paolo Caldarella, Mario Fiorillo, Francesco Porzio, Stefano Postiglione, Riccardo Tempestini, Massimiliano Ferretti, Marco D'Altrui and Gianni Averaimo. Head Coach: Fritz Dennerlein.

South Korea
The following players represented South Korea:

Lee Jeong-seok, Jang Si-yeong, Kim Seong-eun, Yu Seung-hun, Kim Gi-chun, Kim Jae-yeon, Choi Seon-yong, Kim Gil-hwan, Kim Jin-tae, Song Seung-ho, Hong Sun-bo, Lee Taeg-won and Park Sang-won. Head Coach: Jong-Ku Kim.

Soviet Union
The following players represented the Soviet Union:

Yevgeny Sharonov, Nurlan Mendygaliev, Yevgeny Grishin, Aleksandr Kolotov, Sergey Naumov, Viktor Berendyuga, Sergey Kotenko, Dmitry Apanasenko, Georgi Mschvenieradze, Mikhail Ivanov, Sergey Markoch, Nikolai Smirnov and Mikheil Giorgadze. Head Coach: Boris Popov.

West Germany
The following players represented West Germany:

Peter Röhle, Dirk Jacoby, Frank Otto, Uwe Sterzik, Armando Fernández, Andreas Ehrl, Ingo Borgmann, Rainer Osselmann, Hagen Stamm, Thomas Huber, Dirk Theismann, René Reimann and Werner Obschernikat. Head Coach: Nicola Firuio.

Group B

China
The following players represented China:

Ni Shiwei, Wang Minhui, Yang Yong, Yu Xiang, Huang Long, Huang Qijiang, Cui Shiping, Zhao Bilong, Li Jianxiong, Cai Shengliu, Wen Fan, Ge Jianqing and Zheng Qing. Head Coach: Peng Shaorong.

Greece
The following players represented Greece:

Nikolaos Christoforidis, Philippos Kaiafas, Epaminondas Samartzidis, Anastassios Tsikaris, Kyriakos Giannopoulos, Aris Kefalogiannis, Nikolaos Venetopoulos, Dimitrios Seletopoulos, Antonios Aronis, Evangelos Pateros, Georgios Mavrotas and Evangelos Patras. Head Coach: Koulis Iosifidis

Hungary
The following players represented Hungary:

Péter Kuna, Gábor Bujka, Gábor Schmiedt, Zsolt Petőváry, István Pintér, Tibor Keszthelyi, Balázs Vincze, Zoltán Mohi, Tibor Pardi, László Tóth, András Gyöngyösi, Zoltán Kósz and Imre Tóth. Head Coach: Zoltan Kasas

Spain
The following players represented Spain:

Jesús Rollán, Miguel Chillida, Marco Antonio González, Miguel Pérez, Manuel Estiarte, Pere Robert, Jorge Payá, José Rodriguez, Jorge Sans, Salvador Gómez, Mariano Moya, Jorge Neira and Pedro Garcia. Head Coach: Antonio Esteller.

United States
The following players represented the United States:

Craig Wilson, Kevin Robertson, James Bergeson, Peter Campbell, Douglas Kimbell, Edward Klass, Alan Mouchawar, Jeffrey Campbell, Greg Boyer, Terry Schroeder, Jody Campbell, Christopher Duplanty and Michael Evans. Head Coach: Bill Barnett.

Yugoslavia
The following players represented Yugoslavia:

Head coach:  Ratko Rudić

References

1988 Summer Olympics